Charley Sings Everybody's Choice is the twenty-ninth studio album by American country music artist Charley Pride. It was released in March 1982 via RCA Victor Records and was produced by Norro Wilson. The album included three singles, all of which became major hits on the country charts: "Mountain of Love," "I Don't Think She's in Love Anymore" and "You're So Good When You're Bad." The album itself would also reach chart positions on multiple surveys following its original release.

Background and content
On Charley Sings Everybody's Choice, Nashville producer Norro Wilson teamed up with Charley Pride for the first time. The album would shift Pride's sound into a more modern country pop style. Pride had previously recorded with Jerry Bradley, who was behind most of his previous albums and hit singles in the mid 1970s. Everybody's Choice was recorded at Music City Music Hall, a studio located in Nashville, Tennessee. The album was recorded in two sessions in November 1981 and January 1982. With the exception of one track produced by Jerry Bradley, all of the tracks were produced by Norro Wilson. The project contained ten tracks. Included was a cover of pop hit "Mountain of Love," which Pride would eventually release as a single. The remaining nine songs were new recordings composed by Nashville songwriters, such as John Schweers, Larry Henley and Ben Peters.

Release and reception

Charley Sings Everybody's Choice was released in March 1982 on RCA Victor Records. It would be Pride's twenty ninth studio release in his music career. The album was originally distributed as a vinyl LP, containing five songs on each side of the record. It would later be re-released in a digital format to sites such as Apple Music. It spent a total of 24 weeks on the Billboard Top Country Albums chart and peaked at number ten on the list in June 1982. It was also his first studio album to reach a peak position on the Australian Kent Music Report chart, reaching number 95. Everybody's Choice received a 4.5 star rating from Allmusic's Tom Roland who commented, "Dumb title, but it's an excellent album. Producer Norro Wilson revitalized Pride's career by bringing out the Memphis soul that rests in the shadows of his country veneer."

Charley Pride Sings Everybody's Choice included three singles which all became major hits. Its first single to become a hit was Pride's cover of "Mountain of Love" which was released in November 1981. After 18 weeks on the Billboard country chart, it topped the survey by March 1982. "I Don't Think She's in Love Anymore" was then spawned as the album's second single in March 1982. It peaked at number two on the Billboard country list in June of that year. Its final single release was "You're So Good When You're Bad," which was issued in July 1982. The song became the album's third number one Billboard single by November 1982. In Canada, the album's first two singles became number one hits on the RPM country chart. "You're So Good When You're Bad" would peak at number two.

Track listing

Vinyl version

Digital version

Personnel
All credits are adapted from the liner notes of Charley Sings Everybody's Choice.

Musical and technical personnel
 Herb Burnette – art direction
 Jerry Bradley – producer (track five only)
 The Cherry Sisters – background vocals
 Randy Kling – mastering
 The Nashville Edition – background vocals
 Charley Pride – lead vocals, producer (track five only)
 Pinwheel Studios – art direction
 Nick Sangiamo – photography
 Norro Wilson – producer

Chart performance

Release history

References

1982 albums
Albums produced by Norro Wilson
Charley Pride albums
RCA Victor albums